The 2018–19 Wessex Football League season (known as the Sydenhams Football League (Wessex) for sponsorship reasons) is the 33rd in the history of the Wessex Football League since its establishment in 1986. The league consists of two divisions: the Premier Division and Division One.

The constitution was announced on 25 May 2018. Only one promotional spot from the Premier Division, to the Southern League Division One South and West, was available.

Sholing won the league with eight matches remaining, eventually breaking several records on the way, including biggest points gap to the runners up (31 points), and record points per game ratio (2.763).

Premier Division
The Premier Division is reduced from 22 clubs to 20 after Blackfield & Langley were promoted to the Southern League, Amesbury Town, Newport (IOW) and Petersfield Town were relegated to Division One, and Andover Town were demoted to Division One for refusing promotion to the Southern League. Three teams joined the division:

Andover New Street, runners-up in Division One.
Christchurch, champions of Division One.
Tadley Calleva, third-placed club in Division One.

League table

Division One
Division One remains at 19 clubs after Christchurch, Andover New Street and Tadley Calleva were promoted to the Premier Division, and Weymouth Reserves left the league. Four clubs joined the division:

Amesbury Town, relegated from the Premier Division.
Andover Town, demoted from the Premier Division.
Newport (IOW), relegated from the Premier Division.
Petersfield Town, relegated from the Premier Division.

League table

References

External links
 Wessex Football League official site

Wessex Football League seasons
9